The Men's scratch competition at the 2020 UCI Track Cycling World Championships was held on 27 February 2020.

Results
The race was started at 19:57. First rider across the line without a net lap loss won.

References

Men's scratch
UCI Track Cycling World Championships – Men's scratch